South Dakota Highway 324 (SD 324) is a  state highway in the east-central part of the U.S. state of South Dakota. It links Interstate 29 (I-29) south of Brookings with SD 13 west of Elkton. It was commissioned in 1997, along what was formerly named State Highway 218, which itself followed an old routing of U.S. Route 14 (US 14). The renumbering was done to avoid confusion with the parallel 218th Street.

Route description
SD 324 travels east as 217th Street, intersecting both County Road 21 (CR 21) and (CR 23). The highway ends after a few miles at SD 13.

Major intersections

References 

324
Transportation in Brookings County, South Dakota